Stenoscelis is a genus of snout and bark beetles in the family Curculionidae. There are at least 30 described species in Stenoscelis.

Species
These 35 species belong to the genus Stenoscelis:

References

Further reading

External links

 

Cossoninae